The 1946 Istanbul Football Cup season was the fourth season of the cup. Beşiktaş JK won the cup for the second time. The tournament was single-elimination.

Season

Quarterfinals

|}

|}

Semifinals

|}

Final
February 17, 1946
Attendance:10,000
Şeref Stadium

References

Istanbul Football Cup
Istanbul